Townsend Entertainment (also known as The Townsend Entertainment Company and officially, Townsend Entertainment Corporation) is an American entertainment company, involved primarily in the production of films and television programs. Townsend Entertainment was founded by actor, producer, director and writer Robert Townsend. Its headquarters are located in Beverly Hills, California.

Overview 
Townsend Entertainment was founded by Robert Townsend in July 1995. It is just one of several entertainment companies that Townsend has founded. His others include Tinsel Townsend Productions, Inc. which produced The Meteor Man (1993) and Townsend Television (1993), Conquering Unicorn Inc. producing Hollywood Shuffle in 1987, and more.

History 
In 1995, Townsend Entertainment partnered with Warner Bros. for the production of The Parent 'Hood, a family sitcom starring Townsend as Robert Peterson. The show was first released on January 18, 1995 and aired until July 25, 1999. In the show's earlier seasons, it was revered as "the 'Cosby Show' of the '90's" intertwining family morals and values with comedy.

Townsend Entertainment collaborated with V Studio to produce In the Hive (2012), a drama film starring Jonathan McDaniel, Michael Clarke Duncan, Vivica A. Fox and Loretta Devine. The film was written by Cheryl West and directed and produced by Robert Townsend.

In more recent years, Townsend Entertainment released Playin' for Love, a romantic comedy about a high school basketball coach and his star player's mother. Starring Robert Townsend and Salli Richardson, the film was released on January 16, 2015. The film made its debut at the 17th Annual American Black Film Festival (ABFF) in Miami Beach, Florida in 2013 at the Colony Theatre. The screening was a red carpet event featuring a live mural by MLK Mural. Townsend was awarded a grant from the City of Miami Community Redevelopment Agency for the film and employed students from the University of Miami to assist in the making of the final product.

Films 
 Why We Laugh: Black Comedians on Black Comedy, 2009
 In the Hive, 2012
 Playin' for Love, 2015

Television Shows 
 The Parent 'Hood, 1995
 Musical Theater of Hope, 2009
 Diary of a Single Mom, 2012

Awards and nominations 
The Parent 'Hood 
 American Cinema Foundation, 1997
 E Pluribus Unum Award – Television Series Comedy
 NCLR Bravo Awards Nominations, 1996
 Outstanding Television Series Actress in a Crossover Role, Reagan Gomez-Preston
 Young Artist Award Nominations, 1996
 Best Performance by an Actress Under Ten – Television, Kylie Erica Mar
 Young Artist Award Winners, 1997
 Best Performance in a TV Comedy/Drama – Supporting Young Actress Age Ten or Under, Ashli Adams
 Best Performance in a TV Comedy/Drama – Supporting Young Actor Age Ten or Under, Curtis Williams
 
 Young Artist Award Nominations, 1998
 Best Family TV Comedy Series
 Best Performance in a TV Comedy Series – Young Actress Age Ten or Under, Ashli Adams
 Best Performance in a TV Comedy Series – Young Actor Age Ten or Under, Curtis Williams
 Best Performance in a TV Comedy Series – Guest Starring Young Actor, Billee Thomas
 Best Performance in a TV Comedy Series – Guest Starring Young Actor, Cody McMains
In the Hive
 NAACP Image Awards Nominations, 2013
 Outstanding Actress in a Motion Picture, Loretta Devine

See also 
 Robert Townsend
 Tinsel Townsend
 Conquering Unicorn
 Making the Five Heartbeats

References 

1995 establishments in the United States